The Municipality of Oplotnica is a municipality in the traditional region of Styria in northeastern Slovenia. The seat of the municipality is the town of Oplotnica. It was formed in 1998, when it was split from the Municipality of Slovenska Bistrica.

Settlements
In addition to the municipal seat of Oplotnica, the municipality also includes the following settlements:

 Božje
 Brezje pri Oplotnici
 Čadram
 Dobriška Vas
 Dobrova pri Prihovi
 Gorica pri Oplotnici
 Koritno
 Kovaški Vrh
 Lačna Gora
 Malahorna
 Markečica
 Okoška Gora
 Pobrež
 Prihova
 Raskovec
 Straža pri Oplotnici
 Ugovec
 Zgornje Grušovje
 Zlogona Gora
 Zlogona Vas

References

External links

Municipality of Oplotnica on Geopedia
Oplotnica municipal site

Oplotnica
1998 establishments in Slovenia